Benjamin Insfran (born 14 April 1972 in Porto Murtinho, Mato Grosso do Sul) is a male beach volleyball player from Brazil. Insfran and partner Márcio Araújo won the bronze medal at the 2003 Beach Volleyball World Championships in Rio de Janeiro, Brazil, and represented their native country at the 2004 Summer Olympics in Athens, Greece.

References

External links
 
 
 

1972 births
Living people
Brazilian men's beach volleyball players
Beach volleyball players at the 2004 Summer Olympics
Olympic beach volleyball players of Brazil
Sportspeople from Mato Grosso do Sul